Burley Follett was the 4th and 8th mayor of Green Bay, Wisconsin.

Biography
Follett was born on December 30, 1806, in Otsego County, New York. In 1822, he moved to Detroit, Michigan. Follett first came to Wisconsin to deliver supplies to the garrisons of Fort Howard and Fort Winnebago. He took up permanent residence in Green Bay following the Black Hawk War. Follett married Elizabeth Arndt Ward, with whom he had eleven children. They lived for a time in De Pere, Wisconsin. After their return to Green Bay, Follett worked in the employment of Frank B. Desnoyers, who would also become Mayor of Green Bay. Follett died on February 21, 1877, following a stroke.

Political career
Follett was mayor in 1858 and 1863. Previously, he had been register of deeds and treasurer of Green Bay, as well as an alderman.

References

1806 births
1877 deaths
People from Otsego County, New York
Politicians from Detroit
Mayors of Green Bay, Wisconsin
19th-century American politicians
People from De Pere, Wisconsin